Bursa lamarckii (Lamarck's frog shell) is a species of sea snail, a marine gastropod mollusk in the family Bursidae, the frog shells.

Description
The shell size varies between 33 mm and 80 mm.

Distribution
This species is distributed in the Red Sea and in the central and west Indo-Pacific region.

Etymology
The snail is named after Jean-Baptiste Lamarck.

References

 Sheppard, A (1984). The molluscan fauna of Chagos (Indian Ocean) and an analysis of its broad distribution patterns. Coral Reefs 3: 43-50.

External links
 

Bursidae
Gastropods described in 1853
Jean-Baptiste Lamarck